Vampyrìsme... is the fifth studio album by Italian band Theatres des Vampires, released on September 15, 2003 by Beyond... Productions. It is a re-recorded version of the band's 1996 debut album Vampyrìsme, Nècrophilie, Nècrosadisme, Nècrophagie. The album was re-recorded entirely by Theatres des Vampires with guest appearances from former Cradle of Filth guitarist Gian Pyres and Christian Death vocalist Valor Kand. The album has also four new bonus tracks.

"Kingdom of Vampires" is a re-recording of the eponymous song present in Theatres des Vampires' 1995 demo Nosferatu, eine Simphonie des Gravens.

Track listing

Personnel
 Lord Vampyr (Alessandro Nunziati) – lead vocals
 Gabriel Valerio – drums, backing vocals
 Alessandro Pallotta – guitars
 Zimon Lijoi – bass
 Fabian Varesi – keyboards, backing vocals, musical arrangements
 Sonya Scarlet – female backing vocals
 Count Morgoth (Roberto Cufaro) – guitars
 Roberto Grasso – backing vocals
 Gian Pyres (Gianpiero Piras) – guitars (on track 12)
 Valor Kand – backing vocals (on track 14)

Theatres des Vampires albums
2003 albums